Voice 110 Emergency Control Room is a 2019 Japanese TV drama series that aired on Nippon TV from 13 July 2019 to 21 September 2019. It is based on the Korean drama series Voice. The series stars Toshiaki Karasawa and Yōko Maki as protagonists Shōgo Higuchi and Hikari Tachibana respectively. A sequel, titled Voice II 110 Emergency Control Room, was later greenlit and aired from 10 July 2021 to 21 September 2021.

Premise 
Three years after his wife's murder, inspector "Mad Dog" Shōgo Higuchi partners with voice profiler Hikari Tachibana to form the Emergency Call Unit (ECU). Tachibana is gifted with exceptional hearing and uses minute audial clues to resolve crises while searching for Higuchi's wife's murderer.

Episode list

Cast

Featured 

 Toshiaki Karasawa as Shōgo Higuchi
 Yōko Maki as Hikari Tachibana
 Takahisa Masuda as Tōru Ishikawa
 Yūsuke Iseya as Shizuku Hongo

Supporting 

 Kentarō Tamura as Takumi Ogata
 Natsumi Ishibashi as Shiori Morishita
 Yūichi Kimura as Takashi Okihara
 Honoka Yahagi as Aoi Morishita
 Momoko Kikuchi as Miki Higuchi
 Tōru Tezuka as Wataru Uesugi

Reception 
The first episode of season one had a viewership of 12.6%, which Korean entertainment company CJ ENM noted was significantly higher than previously aired dramas, while its last episode had a viewership of 12.9%.

References

External links 

 Official site

2019 Japanese television series debuts 

Japanese television series
2019 Japanese television series endings